Choo Young-woo (born June 5, 1999) is a South Korean actor. He made his acting debut in the boys' love web series You Make Me Dance (2021).

Filmography

Television series

Web series

Awards and nominations

References

External links
 
 

1999 births
Living people
South Korean male television actors
South Korean male web series actors
21st-century South Korean male actors
Korea National University of Arts alumni